Miavaq (also Romanized as Mīāvaq and Mīyāvaq) is a village in Bakeshluchay Rural District, in the Central District of Urmia County, West Azerbaijan Province, Iran. At the 2006 census, its population was 2,049, in 548 families.

References 

Populated places in Urmia County